Motion Blur or Motion Blur Game Studio (Turkish: Motion Blur Oyun Stüdyosu) founded in 2004, Ataşehir, Istanbul based computer game developer. Kabus 22 on sale worldwide has produced the first Turkish game.

Developed games 
 Kabus 22 (PC, 2006)
 Space Cake (Mobile, 2014)

Sources 

2004 establishments in Turkey
Video game companies established in 2004
Video game companies of Turkey
Video game development companies